Patricia Chauvet (born 11 May 1967 in Villeneuve-Saint-Georges, Val-de-Marne) is a retired French alpine skier. She competed at four Winter Olympics.

World Cup victories

References

1967 births
Living people
Sportspeople from Villeneuve-Saint-Georges
French female alpine skiers
Olympic alpine skiers of France
Alpine skiers at the 1988 Winter Olympics
Alpine skiers at the 1992 Winter Olympics
Alpine skiers at the 1994 Winter Olympics
Alpine skiers at the 1998 Winter Olympics